Recon (appearing later as RECON) is a role-playing game wherein players assume the role of U.S. military characters during the Vietnam War. It originally started as more of a wargame with role-playing elements, like Behind Enemy Lines and Twilight 2000, and gradually evolved into a full role-playing game.

Editions

Original Recon

The first edition was written by Joe F. Martin and published by RPG, Inc. in 1982 as a 44-page book. A 44-page digest-sized second edition packaged with a referee's screen was published in 1983 by RPG, Inc. This edition introduced the idea of easily created and disposable characters. Like Dungeons and Dragons, the Mission Director (the referee or Game Master) used a Random Encounters table to generate terrain and villages, create groups of adversaries for the players to fight, obstacles to overcome, or problems to solve. Combat was resolved using miniatures rules.

Recon is a mildly controversial modern military system of jungle combat in the Vietnam war. The rules cover character creation, skills, recon teams, missions, recruiting and debriefing, hand-to-hand combat, small arms and heavy weapons, and terrain generation.

San Succi (1982) was a map pack. It detailed a 16-block area in 1:72 scale for use with 20mm or 25mm lead figures. It also contained a guide to the buildings on the map, a Non-Player Character (NPC) generating system, and a vehicular combat system (called ROADKILL).

Sayaret/Track Commander (1982) was a supplement set during the Arab-Israeli Wars (1967 to 1983). Players could generate Israeli soldier characters that could operate as a commando detachment or a tank crew. It allowed the Mission Director to run Israeli commando raids or tank battles.

The Haiphong H.A.L.O.: SOG Operations in North Vietnam (1983) was the first adventure campaign, and involved missions behind enemy lines in North Vietnam. It expanded roleplay to include US Army Special Forces, Navy SEAL, and Marine Force Recon commando characters, and detailed real-world airborne, sea, and amphibious insertion techniques. Missions included reconnaissance, raiding, sabotage, assassination/ambush, prisoner snatching, and search and rescue.

Hearts & Minds (1983) was the second adventure campaign, and involved a cadre training mission in the Central Highlands of South Vietnam. Characters are part of a Special Forces "A" Team sent to train a group of Montagnard tribesmen to fight. They have to win the tribespeople over, protect them from reprisals, and secure their area of operations. It included a random-generation tunnel complex table.

Headhunters Ltd. (1984) was a contemporary adventure campaign where the players play veteran mercenaries working for the eponymous Mercenary Force. It was announced in the gaming press but was probably never released before RPG, Inc. went out of business.

Platoon 20 RECON was a line of 20mm (1:72 Scale) lead figures for use with RECON. They came 5 figures per set, including the Vietnam-era American Army (Infantry, Special Forces and Recondos), ARVN troops, Nung and Montagnard mercenaries, VC Main Force, and NVA troops. There were also Israeli troops and PLO terrorists for use with Sayaret/Track Commander.

The Revised RECON

The Revised RECON was designed by Erick Wujcik and published by Palladium Books in 1986 as a 152-page book. It was a reworking of the 1982 Recon tactical miniatures game in which Wujcik turned the focus of the game to ambushes to transform a game about miniatures warfare into a role-playing game. Because of its origins as a miniatures game, The Revised RECON was the only Palladium game, aside from Valley of the Pharaohs (1983), that did not use the company's house Megaversal system. However, Palladium does provide conversion rules in order to bring things in line with the rest of their role-playing game series.

Many of the basic rules from the original Recon were kept the same, but Wujcik made an attempt to "balance" them. This was achieved by reducing elements of chance or luck. For instance, rather than randomizing the number of skills a character had, one could select a number of skills based on his class. Another significant change was the concept of a "minimum" skill level for weapon proficiencies. These were originally decided by rolling percentile dice, which meant that a character could theoretically have a skill level anywhere from 1 (meaning that he was a very poor shot) to 100. However, in the revised edition, a low roll could be "bumped" up to whatever the minimum skill level was for that particular weapon (usually 20–30). Also notable in the revised edition was the substantial amount of information it provided about equipment and vehicles. Whereas RPG Inc.'s version had only limited information regarding guns, the Palladium edition had pages of gun statistics as well as fully illustrated, detailed descriptions of aircraft, seacraft, and vehicles, rules for playing mercenaries, several scenarios, and guidelines for interfacing The Revised RECON characters with other Palladium game systems.

The new edition focused more on the fictional Recon world, which used OPFOR-type nicknames for major nations. Countries included "Stateside", "Big Red", People's China, Southern 'Nam, People's 'Nam, Lao, Buntar, Coluzia, Delancourt (a mixture of Guyana and Belize), Sangria, San Isabel, San Marcos, Tragnar (a mixture of Cuba and Haiti), Boorland, Chandracia (a mixture of the Middle East, Iran, and the Arabian Peninsula), Ephor, Greenham Isle (a mixture of the Falklands and Lebanon), Sofi, Grugashan (a mixture of Iraq and Libya), Iswandah, and Dakali.

Advanced RECON
The Revised RECON received only one additional book, Advanced RECON, released February 1987. It was an expansion of the rules allowing the creation of Special Operations characters and detailed a four-mission campaign set in 1960s Laos. There were also sections on American and North Vietnamese tactics and strategy, period electronic equipment, a primer on the game world in 1965, and briefings on the Kingdom of Laos and other military and government agencies.

Deluxe Revised RECON
Palladium published Deluxe Revised RECON in April 1999. This integrated and reprinted the content from both The Revised RECON and Advanced RECON into one book. It also introduced new rules, focusing more on the characters' lives after the wars.

Reception
Brian R. Train reviewed the original Recon in Space Gamer No. 70 (1984). He commented that "Recon is the game for the mercenary fan. It is a pleasure to play and a fine addition to the large inventory of roleplaying games. Supplements have already appeared: a Mission Director's screen; San Succi, a package of 20mm floorplans for a modern adventure city; Hearts & Minds and Sayaret/Track Commander, two booklets dealing with Montagnard warfare and Arab/Israeli commando action, respectively. If you are all interested in this historical period, Recon is well worth the money."

Robert Neville reviewed The Revised RECON for White Dwarf #83 (1986), and stated that "Unluckily, some people may well realise that the sections on military hardware and equipment are probably the best in any contemporary roleplaying game. Luckily, I hope people have more sense than to touch this with a bargepole. Unluckily, I'm not so sure they have."

Other reviews
Different Worlds #26
Different Worlds #46

References

External links
The Revised RECON official discussion board at Palladium Books' Forums of the Megaverse
Recon role-playing games at RPG Geek Database
Recon role-playing games at RPGnet Game Index

Historical role-playing games
Megaverse (Palladium Books)
Military role-playing games
Vietnam War games
Role-playing games introduced in 1982